Caloptilia loxocentra is a moth of the family Gracillariidae. It is known from New South Wales, Australia.

References

loxocentra
Moths of Australia
Moths described in 1915